The West Anatolia Region (Turkish: Batı Anadolu Bölgesi) (TR5) is a statistical region in Turkey. Its largest city is Ankara, which serves as the national capital.

Subregions and provinces 

 Ankara Subregion (TR51)
 Ankara Province (TR510)
 Konya Subregion (TR52)
 Konya Province (TR521)
 Karaman Province (TR522)

Age groups

Internal immigration

State register location of West Anatolia residents

Marital status of 15+ population by gender

Education status of 15+ population by gender

See also 
 NUTS of Turkey

References

External links 
 TURKSTAT

Sources 
 ESPON Database

Statistical regions of Turkey